Mandingha Kosso Moanda is a Congolese academic and ambassador of the Next Einstein Forum.

Moanda was educated at the Marien Ngouabi University.

References

Republic of the Congo academics
Living people
Year of birth missing (living people)